Events in the year 1814 in India.

Events
National income - ₹13,556 million
 The Anglo-Nepalese War (also known as the Nepal War or the Gorkha War) began.

Law

References

 
India
Years of the 19th century in India